Ebenezer Scrooge is the protagonist of Charles Dickens's 1843 novella A Christmas Carol. At the beginning of the novella, Scrooge is a cold-hearted miser who despises Christmas. The tale of his redemption by three spirits (the Ghost of Christmas Past, the Ghost of Christmas Present, and the Ghost of Christmas Yet to Come) has become a defining tale of the Christmas holiday in the English-speaking world.

Dickens describes Scrooge thus early in the story: "The cold within him froze his old features, nipped his pointed nose, shrivelled his cheek, stiffened his gait; made his eyes red, his thin lips blue; and spoke out shrewdly in his grating voice." Towards the end of the novella, the three spirits show Scrooge the errors of his ways, and he becomes a better, more generous man.

Scrooge's last name has entered the English language as a byword for greed and misanthropy, while his catchphrase, "Bah! Humbug!" is often used to express disgust with many modern Christmas traditions.



Description 
Charles Dickens describes Scrooge as "a squeezing, wrenching, grasping, scraping, clutching, covetous, old sinner! Hard and sharp as flint... secret, and self-contained, and solitary as an oyster." He does business from a Cornhill warehouse and is known among the merchants of the Royal Exchange as a man of good credit. Despite having considerable personal wealth, he underpays his clerk Bob Cratchit and hounds his debtors relentlessly while living cheaply and joylessly in the chambers of his deceased business partner, Jacob Marley. Most of all, he detests Christmas, which he associates with reckless spending. When two men approach him on Christmas Eve for a donation to charity, he sneers that the poor should avail themselves of the treadmill or the workhouses, or else die to reduce the surplus population. He also refuses his nephew Fred's invitation to Christmas dinner and denounces him as a fool for celebrating Christmas.

That night, Scrooge is visited by Marley's ghost, who is condemned to walk the world forever bound in chains as punishment for his greed and inhumanity in life. Marley tells Scrooge that he will be visited by three spirits, hoping that he will mend his ways; if he does not, Marley warns, Scrooge will wear even heavier chains than his in the afterlife.

The first spirit then visits Scrooge, The Ghost of Christmas Past, who shows Scrooge visions of his early life. These visions establish that Scrooge's unloving father placed him in a boarding school, where at Christmas he remained alone while his schoolmates returned home to their families. When his beloved sister Fan came to take him home one Christmas, this became Scrooge's one happy childhood memory. She later died after giving birth to Fred. Scrooge then apprenticed at the warehouse of a jovial and generous master, Mr. Fezziwig. He fell in love with a young woman named Belle and proposed marriage, but gradually his love for Belle was overwhelmed by his love for money. Belle realised this and, saddened by his greed, left him one Christmas, eventually marrying another man. The present-day Scrooge reacts to these memories with nostalgia and deep regret.

The Ghost of Christmas Present arrives next. It shows Scrooge that his greed and selfishness have hurt others as well, particularly Cratchit, who cannot afford to provide his desperately ill son Tiny Tim with medical treatment because of Scrooge's miserliness. The Spirit tells a horrified Scrooge that Tiny Tim will die unless something changes, and throws back at Scrooge his own heartless words about the poor and destitute. Finally, the Ghost of Christmas Yet to Come shows Scrooge where his greed and selfishness will lead: a lonely death and an overgrown grave, unpaid servants stealing his belongings, debtors relieved at his passing, and the Cratchit family devastated by the loss of Tiny Tim.

Scrooge asks this Spirit if this future can still be changed, but the Spirit does not reply. Scrooge then begs this Spirit for another chance, promising to change his ways – and wakes up in his bed on Christmas Day. Overjoyed, Scrooge commits to being more generous and compassionate; he accepts his nephew's invitation to Christmas dinner, provides for Cratchit and his family, and donates to the charity fund.

In the end, he becomes known as the embodiment of the Christmas spirit and as a "second father" to Tiny Tim.

Origins
Several theories have been put forward as to where Dickens got the inspiration for the character.

Ebenezer Lennox  (1792–1836) was supposedly a merchant from Edinburgh who won a catering contract for King George IV's visit to Scotland. He was buried in Canongate Kirkyard, with a gravestone that is now lost. The theory is that Dickens noticed the gravestone that described Scroggie as being a "meal man" (grain merchant) but misread it as "mean man." This theory has been described as "a probable Dickens hoax" for which "[n]o one could find any corroborating evidence". There is no record of anyone named Scroggie in the Edinburgh census returns of the period. Jemmy Wood, owner of the Gloucester Old Bank and possibly Britain's first millionaire, was nationally renowned for his stinginess, and may have been another model for Scrooge. The man whom Dickens eventually mentions in his letters and who strongly resembles the character portrayed by Dickens' illustrator, John Leech, was a noted British eccentric and miser named John Elwes (1714–1789). Another suggested inspiration for the character of Scrooge is Daniel Dancer, who Dickens mentions, along with Elwes, in Our Mutual Friend.

It has been suggested that he chose the name Ebenezer ("stone (of) help") to reflect the help given to Scrooge to change his life. Commentators have suggested that the surname was partly inspired by the word "scrouge", meaning "crowd" or "squeeze". The word was in use from 1820.

Kelly writes that Scrooge may have been influenced by Dickens' conflicting feelings for his father, whom he loved and demonised. This psychological conflict may be responsible for the two radically different Scrooges in the tale—one a cold, stingy recluse, the other a benevolent, loving man. Robert Douglas-Fairhurst, a professor of English literature, considers that in the opening part of the book portraying young Scrooge's lonely and unhappy childhood, and his aspiration to rise from poverty to riches "is something of a self-parody of Dickens's fears about himself"; the post-transformation parts of the book are how Dickens optimistically sees himself.

One school of thought is that Dickens based Scrooge's views of the poor on those of demographer and political economist Thomas Malthus, as evidenced by his callous attitude towards the "surplus population". "And the Union workhouses? ... The treadmill and the Poor Law are in full vigour, then?" are a reflection of a sarcastic question raised by the reactionary philosopher Thomas Carlyle: "Are there not treadmills, gibbets; even hospitals, poor-rates, New Poor-Law?"

There are literary precursors for Scrooge in Dickens's own works. Peter Ackroyd, Dickens's biographer, sees similarities between Scrooge and the title character of  Martin Chuzzlewit, although the latter is "a more fantastic image" than the former; Ackroyd observes that Chuzzlewit's transformation to a charitable man is parallel to that of Scrooge. Douglas-Fairhurst sees that the minor character Gabriel Grub from The Pickwick Papers was also an influence when creating Scrooge.

Analysis 
Scrooge's character, particularly how it changes throughout A Christmas Carol, has been the subject of several analyses.

In other media
 The character of Scrooge McDuck, created by Carl Barks, was at least partially based on Ebenezer Scrooge: "I began to think of the great Dickens Christmas story about Scrooge...I was just thief enough to steal some of the idea and have a rich uncle for Donald."

Portrayals

 Richard John Smith in A Christmas Carol; or, Past, Present, and Future (1844)
 Tom Ricketts in A Christmas Carol, 1908
 Marc McDermott in 1910
 Seymour Hicks in Scrooge 1913, and again in Scrooge, 1935
 Rupert Julian in 1916
 Russell Thorndike in 1923
 Bransby Williams in 1928 and 1936, 1950 on television
 Lionel Barrymore on radio 1934–1935, 1937, 1939–1953
 John Barrymore in 1936 on radio, for ailing brother Lionel
 Orson Welles in 1938 on radio replacing Lionel Barrymore for one appearance only.
 Reginald Owen in 1938
 Claude Rains in 1940 on radio
 Ronald Colman in 1941 on radio and again in 1949
 John Carradine in 1947 on radio and television
 Taylor Holmes in 1949
 Alastair Sim in 1951, and again in 1971 (voice)
 Fredric March in 1954
 Basil Rathbone in 1956 and 1958
 John McIntire in 1957
 Stan Freberg in Green Chri$tma$, 1958.
 Jim Backus as Mr. Magoo in Mister Magoo's Christmas Carol, 1962
 Cyril Ritchard in 1964
 Sterling Hayden as Daniel Grudge in Rod Serling's A Carol for Another Christmas (1964)
 Wilfrid Brambell in a 1966 radio musical version (adapted from his Broadway role)
 Sid James in the Carry On Christmas Specials, 1969
 Ron Haddrick in the animated TV film A Christmas Carol (1969) and again in the Australian animated film A Christmas Carol (1982) 
 Albert Finney in 1970
 Paul Frees in Santa Claus Is Comin To Town, 1970
 Marcel Marceau in 1973
 Michael Hordern in 1977
 Rich Little as W. C. Fields playing Scrooge in Rich Little's Christmas Carol, 1978
 Walter Matthau (voice) in The Stingiest Man in Town, 1978
 Henry Winkler as Benedict Slade in An American Christmas Carol, 1979
 Hoyt Axton as Cyrus Flint in Skinflint: A Country Christmas Carol, 1979
 Mel Blanc (as Yosemite Sam) in Bugs Bunny's Christmas Carol, 1979
 Caroll Spinney as Oscar the Grouch in A Special Sesame Street Christmas, 1979 and again in A Sesame Street Christmas Carol, 2006
 Alan Young (as Scrooge McDuck) in Mickey's Christmas Carol, 1983
 George C. Scott in 1984
 Mel Blanc (as Mr. Spacely) in The Jetsons episode "A Jetson Christmas Carol", 1985
 Oliver Muirhead as "Constable Scrooge" in A Christmas Held Captive, 1986
 Bill Murray as Frank Cross in Scrooged, 1988
 Buddy Hackett (as himself) played Scrooge in the film-within-a-film.
 Rowan Atkinson as Ebenezer Blackadder in Blackadder's Christmas Carol, 1988
 Michael Caine in The Muppet Christmas Carol, 1992
 Jeffrey Sanzel has appeared in more than 1,000 stage performances since 1992.
 Frank Welker as Thaddeus Plotz in the Animaniacs episode, "A Christmas Plotz", 1993
 James Earl Jones in Bah, Humbug, 1994
 Henry Corden (as Fred Flintstone) in A Flintstones Christmas Carol, 1994
 Walter Charles, Tony Randall, Terrence Mann, Hal Linden, Roddy McDowall, F. Murray Abraham, Frank Langella, Tony Roberts, Roger Daltrey, Jonathan Freeman, and Jim Dale in the stage version of Alan Menken's musical 
 Susan Lucci as Elizabeth "Ebbie" Scrooge in Ebbie, 1995
 Tenniel Evans in Focus on the Family Radio Theatre's version of A Christmas Carol (1996)
 Cicely Tyson as Ebenita Scrooge in Ms. Scrooge, 1997
 Tim Curry (voice) in 1997; A Christmas Carol (the Theater at Madison Square Garden 2001 play)
 Jack Palance in 1998
 Patrick Stewart in 1999
 Vanessa Williams as Ebony Scrooge in A Diva's Christmas Carol, 2000
 Ross Kemp as Eddie Scrooge in 2000
 Adrienne Carter as Annie Redfeather as Annie Scrooge in Adventures from the Book of Virtues: Compassion Pt. 1 & 2, 2000
 Dean Jones in Scrooge and Marley, 2001
 Tori Spelling as "Scroogette" Carol Cartman in A Carol Christmas, 2003
 Kelsey Grammer in 2004
 Helen Fraser as Sylvia Hollamby in Bad Girls 2006 Christmas Special
 Joe Alaskey (as Daffy Duck) in Bah, Humduck! A Looney Tunes Christmas, 2006
 Morwenna Banks as Eden Starling (Barbie) in Barbie in A Christmas Carol, 2008
 Kevin Farley as Michael Malone in An American Carol, 2008
 Jim Carrey in 2009 (Carrey also played the three spirits haunting Scrooge).
 Catherine Tate as Nan in Nan's Christmas Carol, 2009
 Matthew McConaughey as Connor "Dutch" Mead in Ghosts of Girlfriends Past, 2009
 Christina Milian as Sloane Spencer in Christmas Cupid, 2010
 Mark Rhodes in the 2010 Christmas special of Sam & Mark's TMi Friday
 Eric Braeden as Victor Newman in "Victor's Christmas Carol" on The Young and the Restless, December 2010
 Michael Gambon as Kazran Sardick in "A Christmas Carol" on Doctor Who, December 2010
 Brenda Song as London Tipton in The Suite Life on Deck episode, "A London Carol", 2010
 George Lopez as Grouchy Smurf in the 2011 film The Smurfs: A Christmas Carol Emmanuelle Vaugier as Carol Huffman in the 2012 TV film It's Christmas, Carol! Andy Day in the 2013 CBeebies pantomime A CBeebies Christmas Carol Robert Powell in Neil Brand's 2014 BBC Radio 4 adaptation of A Christmas Carol.
 Ned Dennehy in the BBC drama Dickensian, 2015
 Kerry Shale as Diesel in the Thomas & Friends episode, "Diesel's Ghostly Christmas", 2015
 Jason Graae in the musical Scrooge in Love!, 2016
 Kelly Sheridan as Starlight Glimmer (playing Snowfall Frost) in the My Little Pony: Friendship Is Magic episode "A Hearth's Warming Tail", 2016
 Henry Shields as Chris Bean (with Henry Lewis as Robert Grove attempting to take over, with the role being usurped from Derek Jacobi to begin with) in Mischief Theatre's A Christmas Carol Goes Wrong, 2017.
 Christopher Plummer in The Man Who Invented Christmas, 2017 
 Denny Laine in Decker, "Double Decker", 2017
 Stuart Brennan in 2018
 Guy Pearce in the BBC/FX miniseries, 2019
 Nicholas Farrell in A Christmas Carol: A Ghost Story (2021)
 Will Ferrell in Spirited, 2022
 Luke Evans (voice) in Scrooge: A Christmas Carol'', 2022
 Paul Giamatti in a series of Verizon commercials

See also
 Grinch

Notes

References

Citations

External links
 

Literary characters introduced in 1843
A Christmas Carol characters
Fictional businesspeople
Fictional people from the 19th-century
Fictional people from London
Fictional misers
Christmas characters
Male characters in film
Male characters in literature